Sandra Brand was a writer, born in 1910, who survived the Holocaust and wrote several books and gave lectures on the subject. She died in 2005 at the age of 95.

The Simon Wiesenthal Center awards both the Bruno Brand Tolerance Prize and the Sandra Brand Memorial Book Award to non-fiction works on the subject of tolerance thanks to endowments from her.

During the war, she pretended to be Cecilya Szarek (as described in her book I Dared to Live), and was helped by a German officer.

List of works
 I Dared to Live (1978)
 Between Two Worlds (1982)
 Roma (1992)
 Glimpses of West Africa (1999)
 Good People, Bad People (2004)

References

1910 births
2005 deaths
Holocaust historiography